Stephan Daschner (born August 5, 1988) is a German professional ice hockey defenceman. He is currently playing for the Straubing Tigers in the Deutsche Eishockey Liga (DEL). He has formerly played for ERC Ingolstadt, Hannover Scorpions and Düsseldorfer EG.

On March 26, 2018, after four seasons with DEG, Daschner signed as a free agent to a one-year deal with the Straubing Tigers.

References

External links

1988 births
Living people
Düsseldorfer EG players
ERC Ingolstadt players
German ice hockey defencemen
Hannover Scorpions players
EV Landshut players
Straubing Tigers players
Sportspeople from Ingolstadt